Al-Mashroua Sport Club, is an Iraqi football team based in Babil, that plays in Iraq Division Two.

History

The naming
Al-Mashroua Club was established in 1992 under the name of Saddamiyat Al-Mashroua, where it took its name from the name of the city whose name was changed from Al-Mashroua to the Saddamiyat Al-Mashroua (in relation to Saddam, the head of government at that period), and after the change of the ruling regime and the invasion of Iraq in 2003, The city's previous name was returned and Saddam's name was deleted from it, and accordingly the name of the club was changed.

Managerial history
 Fouad Jawad
 Hassan Hadi
 Mohammed Hussein Arar

See also 
 2018–19 Iraq FA Cup
 2020–21 Iraq FA Cup

References

External links
 Al-Mashroua SC on Goalzz.com

1992 establishments in Iraq
Association football clubs established in 1992
Football clubs in Babil